Dr. Bimal N. Patel is Professor of International Law and Vice-Chancellor of the Rashtriya Raksha University, an Institute of National Importance of India, established by the Parliament of India through RRU Act No. 31, by the Ministry of Home Affairs, Government of India. The headquarters of the University is in Gandhinagar, Gujarat, India. Professor Patel has been serving as a Member of the National Security Advisory Board, an advisory board to the National Security Council headed by the Prime Minister of India. He is a member of the Financial Sector Regulatory Appointments Search Committee (FSRASC), headed by the Cabinet Secretary, established by the Appointments Committee of the Cabinet (ACC) to make recommendations of candidates for the top positions of the financial regulators of India – Reserve Bank of India, Securities and Exchange Board of India, Pension Fund Regulatory and Development Authority of India, Insurance Regulatory and Development Authority of India, Insolvency and Bankruptcy Board of India and International Financial Services Centre Authority.  Dr. Patel served as the Director of the Gujarat National Law University, Gandhinagar for two consecutive terms (2008-2019). He was appointed by a high-level committee headed by the then Chief Justice of India, K G Balakrishnan, at the Supreme Court of India. He served as a member of the 21st Law Commission of India, headed by Justice Balbir Singh Chauhan, Supreme Court of India, and contributed independently or jointly 15 reports or referrals by the Supreme Court of India, including among others, criminal justice reforms, one nation-one election, sedition law, tribunalisation of justice system and prepared consolidated report on all Central Acts of India from 1834 to 2017. He is also one of the Lead Academic Advisers to India for India’s tenure as a member of the UN Security Council 2021-22. He is a member of the Editorial Board of the ICRC International Review of the Red Cross, Geneva. He has served or serves various governmental and public sector organisations and academic institutions. His publications on India and International Law and Responsibility of International Organisations are reviewed and referred by international law scholars and journals. Patel is a former international civil servant, scholar, and academician of international law and diplomacy. An international law jurist, he has extensively studied, researched, commented, and published works on the administrative, procedural and substantive jurisprudence of the International Court of Justice (ICJ), International Tribunal for the Law of the Sea (ITLOS), International Criminal Tribunal for former Yugoslavia (ICTY) and International Labour Organization Administrative Tribunal (Geneva). He has published, edited several books, research papers/articles/surveys in leading academic and international law journals. He has been involved in drafting several national and state primary and secondary legislation, regulations, rules. He has delivered and served as Visiting Faculty at universities in Asia-Pacific and Europe. He has served at the Organisation for the Prohibition of Chemical Weapons, the Hague, Netherlands.

Education
Patel was awarded the first Doctorate of Philosophy in International Law and Governance by the Jaipur National University, Jaipur India under the guidance of Professor V. S. Mani and the second Ph.D. in International law from the prestigious Leiden University.  He acquired LLM in International Law from Leiden University  and Master of Arts in International Relations  from the University of Amsterdam. 
He also obtained Post master's degree Graduate Diploma in International Relations 
from the University of Amsterdam and Post Graduate Diploma in International Relations and Development from the Institute of Social Studies,  the Hague,  The Netherlands.  He received Post Graduate Summer School Certificate in International Relations, Foreign Policy, and Government from the University of Oslo, Norway. He completed his undergraduate studies in Agriculture Science from the Gujarat Agriculture University,  Anand (Gujarat) India.

Career 
Patel served the Organisation for the Prohibition of Chemical Weapons  (OPCW),  the Hague between 1995 and 2009. Patel has researched on the jurisprudence of the International Court of Justice, ITLOS, ICTY, and ILOAT. He has published and edited several books,  research papers/articles/surveys in leading academic and international law journals.  He has experience in designing and implementing international and national development and research programs and projects and networking and coordination with governmental agencies, UN bodies, and academic/research institutions in various parts of the world.

He has published, edited several books, research papers/articles/surveys in leading academic and international law journals. He possesses practical experience in dealing with international administrative law (international civil service laws) and organizational staff-management bodies. He has delivered lectures at Cambridge University, UK, Hague Academy of International Law, the Netherlands, Institute of Social Studies, The Hague, the Netherlands, Erasmus University of Rotterdam School of Law, the Netherlands, University of Oslo, Oslo, Norway, University of Rome, La Sapienza, Rome, Italy, University of Auckland, New Zealand, University of New South Wales, Sydney, Australia. He was also specially invited to address the World Ocean Science Congress. He was also appointed as a member of the search panel for the selection of Governor of the Reserve Bank of India (RBI) and as a member of the six-member panel headed by cabinet secretary PK Sinha to recommend the Chairman of Securities and Exchange Board of India (SEBI). Patel is also member of the high level National Security Advisory Board of India.

Term as Vice Chancellor of Rashtriya Raksha University
Dr. Bimal Patel assumed the charge of the Director-General of Rashtriya Raksha University (erstwhile Rakasha Shakti University) on 20 January 2020.

Term as director of GNLU 
Patel was appointed director of GNLU in 2008. Under the leadership of Patel, GNLU has had steady growth. Since 2011, GNLU has started receiving US$2 million grants from the UGC under its five-year plan for general and overall development. He is credited to have played a pioneering role and responsibility in creating a world-class campus of GNLU spread across 50 acres of land given by the State Government of Gujarat and further generous assistance of nearly US$40 million by the Gujarat Government. He has been instrumental in starting many new courses and programs and has transformed the academic system of GNLU by adopting the Research-Based Teaching University curriculum. He also brought two prestigious global level conferences in India the Prestigious External Program of the Academy in collaboration with The Hague Academy of International Law, one of the most prestigious international law academies, and the Global Maritime Conference where the Under Secretary-General of the United Nations delivered the keynote. Diplomats and administrators of more than 10 countries were present. Judges of the International Court of Justice and International Tribunal for the Law of the Sea were among the participants. Ambassadors and diplomats of different nations took part in this conference along with senior officers of the Indian Government. He was also designated as the Resource Person, UN Institute for Training and Research (UNITAR), Geneva. He has successfully initiated and implemented LLM, Ph.D., diploma, and certificate programs, including on-line programs in law and interdisciplinary fields. He has pioneered in initiating several executive training programs for members of the executive, judiciary, government departments, defense forces, NGOs, among others. He has been instrumental in the public-private partnership model through establishing various chairs and fellowships in the areas of Law of the Sea, Intellectual Property Rights, Mergers and Acquisitions, Labour Laws, Real Estate, Energy Law, Environment and Sustainable Development, International Contracts among others. He has contributed to the creation of a Research-based Teaching University and Research-based Administrative University model, respectively.

2016 

Gujarat National Law University was excoriated by the Gujarat High Court in its order of Jaymin Rajendra Brahmbhatt v. Gujarat National Law University and 5 Others. The order had described the university as an epitome of injustice and set aside the order of a committee established by the university to cancel a student's examination. GNLU filed a letters patent appeal (appeal to a bench of two judges of the same high court) along with an application for urgent hearing of the matter. The application for urgent hearing was dismissed by the Gujarat High Court. The Gujarat High Court finally disposed off the appeal by ordering in independent enquiry as agreed between the parties.

2017 and 2018 

In early 2017, a financial officer filed a petition against GNLU alleging that his oral termination was illegal. In April 2017, Justice Sonia Gokani of the Gujarat High Court ordered that the employee be allowed to continue in service. GNLU appealed the High Court order but was asked by the court to ensure reinstatement of the employee. After taking the employee back into service, GNLU put him on leave. In February 2018, Gujarat High Court ordered GNLU to comply with its earlier order in ‘true spirit’.

In 2019, after two consecutive years at the helm of affairs, Patel was succeeded by Sanjeevi Shanthakumar.

Bills/acts drafted 
The United Nations, the Government of India, and the Government of Gujarat have engaged Patel to act as Adviser to many Ministries and Departments and has been deputed to draft both international, national, and state-level legislation.

 Antarctica Act of India;  
 Deep Seabed Mining Act of India;  
 Corporate Social Responsibility Policy for Public Sector Undertakings;  
 Acts establishing universities such as Gujarat Sports University, Children University, Indian Institute of Teachers’ Education, Gujarat State Litigation Policy; 
 Gujarat Ombudsman (Lokayukta) Bill;  
 Zero Landfill Regulations for 15 Wastes (Legal Guidelines for the Reduction, Recycling and Reuse of Waste);  
 Temple Trust Bill; 
 Draft Statute for Gujarat State Law Commission;  
 Salt-pan Workers’ Welfare Regulations; among others.
 Anti-Piracy Bill of India
 Merchant Shipping Code  
 Private Maritime Security Companies Rules 
 Arbitration and Conciliation (Amendment) Act 2015

Works
 World Court Reference Guide: Judgments, Advisory Opinions and Orders of the Permanent Court of International Justice and the International Court of Justice (1922 - 2000), Kluwer Law International (2002) 
 World Court Reference Guide and the Case-Law Digest (2000 - 2010), Brill / Nijhoff (2014) 
 India and International Law, Volume 1, Nijhoff (2005) 
 India and International Law, Volume 2, Nijhoff (2008)  
 A Comprehensive Guide on Laws of Human Rights Laws of Commonwealth Countries, Wadhwa Publications (2007) 
 Law of the Sea and ITLOS Jurisprudence, Eastern Book Company (2015) 
 Maritime Security and Anti-Piracy: Global Issues and Challenges, Eastern Book Company (2012) 
 Responsibility of International Organisations: Regime of Legal Obligations between the United Nations, the World Bank, the IAEA and the European Union, Eastern Book Company (2013) 
 Indian Banking Law and Case-Law Digest, Eastern Book Company (2014)  
 Food Security Laws: Interdisciplinary Perspective, Eastern Book Company (2013)
 Economic Analysis of Law: An Indian Perspective, Eastern Book Company (2014)
 Law, Politics and Development: Issues and Challenges for the 21st Century of India, Eastern Book Company (2013)
 International Litigation by and against India: EBC 2017 
 National Security of India and International Law (forewords by Henry Kissinger, Ajit Doval and John Norton Moore), Leiden: Brill 2020 
 The State Practice of India and the Development of International Law: Dynamic Interplay between Foreign Policy and International Law, Leiden: Brill 2016 
 Maritime Law Manual of India, Routledge 2021
 Sustainable Development and India, Oxford University Press (2015)

Awards 
 Visiting Professor, University of Barcelona, Spain
 Hague University Faculty Member, the Netherlands
 External Examiner, University of Mauritius, Mauritius
 Visiting Associate Professor, University of Malaya, Malaysia
 Visiting Professor & Eminent Scholar Member, Gujarat National Law University, India
 Adjunct Professor, Sardar Patel University, V. V. Nagar, India
 Visiting Professor & Advisor, MIT School of Government, Pune, India
 Member, ILA Committee on Teaching of International Law
 Life Member and Honorary European Coordinator, Indian Society of International Law
 Member, American, Australian-New Zealand, Indian, European Society of International Law, International Law Association, Netherlands Association of International Law (NVIR)

References 

Indian academic administrators
Scholars from Gujarat
Living people
Legal educators
Indian legal scholars
Alumni
Year of birth missing (living people)